University of Hafr Al Batin, often referred to as UOHB, is a Saudi public university that located in Hafr Albatin city in the eastern province. It was founded in 2014 on the royal decree by King Abdullah on April 3, 2014.

Colleges 
UOHB has 10 colleges which are:
 College of Applied Medical Sciences 
 College of Arts and Sciences – Al-Khafji 
 College of Arts and Sciences – Nairiyah
 College of Arts and Sciences – Quaryah Oliya
 College of Business Administration
 College of Computer Science and Engineering 
 College of Education 
 College of Engineering 
 College of Sciences and Supporting Studies 
 Community College

References

Universities and colleges in Saudi Arabia
Eastern Province, Saudi Arabia